Leyvin Jhojane Balanta Fory (born 3 September 1990) is a  Colombian professional footballer who plays as a left back for Categoría Primera A club Deportes Tolima.

Club career

Independiente Santa Fe 
He was signed by Independiente Santa Fe in 2015.

Career statistics

Club

1 Includes Recopa Sudamericana and Suruga Bank Championship.

Honours

Club 
Santa Fe
Copa Sudamericana    : 2015

References

External links 

1990 births
Living people
Colombian footballers
Categoría Primera A players
Categoría Primera B players
Deportivo Pasto footballers
América de Cali footballers
Independiente Santa Fe footballers
Deportes Tolima footballers
Footballers from Bogotá
Association football fullbacks